The re-latinization of Romanian (also known as re-romanization) was the reinforcement of the Romance features of the Romanian language during the 18th and 19th centuries. In this period, Romanian adopted a Latin-based alphabet to replace the Cyrillic script and borrowed many words from French as well as from Latin and Italian, in order to acquire the lexical tools necessary for modernization. This process coined words for recently introduced objects or concepts (neologisms), added Latinate synonyms for some Slavic and other loanwords, and strengthened some Romance syntactic features.

Some linguistic research emphasize that the use of this term is inappropriate as it conflates the larger process of modernization of the language with the more extreme, and in the end unsuccessful, current of eliminating non-Latin influences, and, secondly, the term's lack of precision is susceptible to lead to confusion as the Latin character of the Romanian language had already been noticed since at least the 15th century.

Background

Romanian is a Romance language with about 25 million native speakers. It is the official language of Romania and Moldova and has a co-official status in Vojvodina (in Serbia). Ethnic Romanians also live in Ukraine and Hungary. Significant Romanian diasporas developed in other European countries (especially in Italy and Spain) and in North America, Australia and Israel. Romanian is closely related to three other Balkan Romance languages, Aromanian (or Macedo-Romanian), Megleno-Romanian and Istro-Romanian, all descending from a common Proto-Romanian language. Romanian is divided into two main dialects, with a northern dialect spoken in Moldavia, northern Transylvania, Maramureș and Banat, and a southern dialect in Wallachia, but transitional variants also exist in Oltenia and Transylvania.

The origin of the Romanians is still subject to scholarly debates. The core of the debate is the continuous presence of the Romanians in the lands now forming Romania north of the Lower Danube. Scholars who propose that the Roman province of Dacia Trajana (which existed to the north of the river for about 165 years) was an important venue of the Romanians' ethnogenesis accept the continuity north of the Danube, a theory also supported by scholars who consider that the origins of the Romanians included territories located not only in Dacia, but also in areas south of the Danube (which were under Roman rule for centuries). Scholars who refute these theories propose that the ethnogenesis of the Romanians started in the south-Danubian provinces and the Romanians' ancestors did not settle in the lands to the north of the Lower Danube before the 11th century.

Romanian developed in territories which were isolated from other Romance languages for more than a thousand years. This geographic isolation gave rise to the development of a number of  specific features. For instance, palatalized dental consonants (especially "z") replaced the non-palatalized consonants in verbs. The number of Romanian words directly inherited from Latin (about 1,550–2,000, depending on the source) is similar to the other Romance languages, and is low in comparison with Medieval Greek (which contained about 3,000 Latin roots). Romanian along with Spanish and Portuguese retained more archaic lexical items from Latin than other Romance languages, most probably due to their peripheral position. For instance, the classical Latin word for beautiful can still be detected in Romanian , Portuguese  and Spanish , but it was replaced by terms deriving from another Latin word,  in French and Italian.

Romanian shares linguistic features with the non-Romance languages of the Balkan Peninsula, which gave rise to the idea of a "Balkan linguistic union". There are some further common features of Albanian and Romanian. Scholars assume that Albanian was closely related to the likely Thracian or Thraco-Dacian substrate languages, whose Romanization gave rise to the development of Romanian, or descends from it. Slavic languages influenced the development of Romanian for centuries. Romanian borrowed hundreds of loanwords from Slavic languages and Slavic influence can be detected in Romanian phonology and morphology. Romanians also adopted Old Church Slavonic as the language of liturgy together with the Cyrillic script.

Flavio Biondo was the first scholar to have observed (in 1435) linguistic affinities between the Romanian and Italian languages, as well as their common Latin origin. When comparing Romanian with other Romance languages, linguists noticed its peculiarities which can be detected at all linguistic levels. In the early 19th century, the Slovene linguist, Jernej Kopitar, suggested that Romanian emerged through the relexification either of an ancient Balkan language or of a Slavic idiom, instead of directly developing from Vulgar Latin. Paul Wexler published a similar hypothesis in 1997. Linguist Anthony P. Grant writes that Wexler's hypothesis is not "completely convincing", stating that the "rise of Romanian still seems to be a case of language shift, analogous to the rise of English in England", with the Romanian substratum equivalent to British Celtic, the Balkan Latin stratum similar to Anglo-Saxon, and the South Slavic superstratum equivalent to the Norman French role. Due to the high ratio of Slavic loanwords, some scholars believed Romanian was a Slavic language. Linguist Posner attributed to Friedrich Diez, who was one of the first German scholars systematically studying Romance philology, the opinion of Romanian ("Wallachian") being a semi-Romance language in the early 19th century.  In his Grammar of the Romance Languages (1836) Diez retains six languages of the Romance area which attract attention, in terms of their grammatical or literary significance: Italian and Romanian, Spanish and Portuguese, Provençal and French. All six languages have their first and common source in Latin, a language which is 'still intertwined with our civilization'. Harald Haarmann considers that any discussion about the position of Romanian within the Romance philology was definitely decided with the Grammar of Diez. After the publication of his Grammar of the Romance Languages, Romanian is always listed among the Romance languages. Schippel observes that since Friedrich Diez' Grammar, the Romance character of Romanian wasn't seriously doubted. Werner Bahner concludes that  “since the second half of the 19th century the  Romance character of the Romanian has to be regarded as an absolutely certain knowledge” as „from the outset Romanian was considered a Romance language”.  As linguist Graham Mallinson emphasizes, "Romanian in its various forms retains enough of its Latin heritage at all linguistic levels to qualify for membership of the Romance family in its own right".

The re-latinization evolved differently in the Romanian-populated areas. In Wallachia and Moldavia from 1760 to 1820–1830 the  lexical influence of French and New Greek was the most influential, while in the Banat and Transylvania the Romanian language adopted words mainly from Latin and German languages. After 1830 the French language became the main source of the borrowings.

When derivations of the Latin type-words are taken into account, research shows that “the proportion of the resulting group in the total vocabulary of Romanian remains, with nearly 80% of types-words in the dictionaries, about the same from the texts of 16/17th centuries to present Romanian”, concluding that “the vocabulary of Old Romanian is as Romanic as the vocabulary of the modern Romanian language”.

Terminology

Relatinization, as linguist Franz Rainer defines it, covers "not only borrowings from Latin at all its stages, including medieval and Neo-Latin, but also latinate formations taken from other European languages". This process can be detected during the history of all Romance languages. In Romanian scholarship, Alexandru Graur seems to have used the term  for the first time  in an article in 1930, referring to the French influence on the development of the Romanian language. A year later, Sextil Pușcariu proposed a new term, most probably because he wanted to cover both the direct borrowings from Latin and of the borrowings from Romance languages. In 1978, Alexandru Niculescu opted for the label  ("Romance Westernization"), while Vasile D. Țâra described the process in 1982 as the "Latin-Romance direction in the modernization of the Romanian literary language".

Linguist Maria Aldea emphasizes that the term  is not adequate to describe the linguistic process which has enriched the Romanian vocabulary with new words of Latin or Romance origin since the early 19th century. Ioana Moldovanu-Cenușă emphasizes the differences between the "Roman Westernization", which took  place in Moldavia and Wallachia under the influences of  the Age of Enlightenment, and the "re-latinization" carried out by the representatives of the Transylvanian School and of the "Latinist current". Historian Ioan-Aurel Pop points out that the lack of precision of the terms may lead to confusion, because the Latin character of the Romanian language was already noticed in the 15th century, placing it in the group of Romance languages.

Development

Transylvanian School and Latinist current

Educated Romanians started to regard Latin and Italian as linguistic models already in the 17th century. Scholars of the Transylvanian School were the first to make concerted efforts to eliminate certain non-Romance features of the language in the late 18th century. They were Greek Catholic (or Uniate) intellectuals tutored in Vienna and Rome who were determined to manifest the Latin origin of Romanian. They regarded the Romanians as "an island of Latinity in a Slav sea". Their activities contributed to the re-orientation of the Romanians' intellectual life towards Western Europe.

These scholars promoted the use of Latin letters in place of Cyrillic script, but the writing system that they developed never won popularity. Their spelling system was primarily designed to demonstrate the Latin roots of the Romanian words, ignoring their contemporary pronunciation. They decided to replace Slavic loanwords with terms of Latin origin, even trying to get rid of the Romanian word for "and", wrongly attributing a Slavic origin to it. They created portmanteau words, containing both Slavic and Latin roots, like  from the Slavic loanword  and the Latin term  (both meaning war).

Scholars of this "Latinist school" (or "Latinist current") often spread extremist views in their works. In 1853, their leader, August Treboniu Laurian, started his History of the Romanians with the legendary founding of Rome in 753 BC. Laurian and Ioan Massim published the two volumes of their Dictionary of the Romanian Language and a glossary to it in the 1870s. They adopted a writing system which demonstrated the etymology of the words and purged the language of most non-Latin terms. The language that they promoted was artificial, bearing "only a vague resemblance to authentic Romanian". The Academic Society (the future Romanian Academy) had initially commissioned the publication of their dictionary, but their exaggerated attempts to purify the language "provoked laughter and permanently discredited the Latinist school", thus their work was the last publication of the Latinist current.

Wallachia and Moldavia

Wallachian and Moldavian writers who took a more conventional approach than the Transylvanian scholars were more successful. Re-latinisation reached its peak in Wallachia in the early 19th century, when Ion Heliade Rădulescu introduced large numbers of Italian neologisms. Subsequently, literary figures at Iași, in Moldavia, began borrowing from French, at the time the language of high European culture. In addition to direct borrowings from Romance languages, loan translations also appeared, although some of them could not survive. These were neologisms build as internal lexical formations, created by derivation of the Latin-inherited "root words" from the Romanian groundstock. Romance doubletsthe coexistence of inherited Latin terms and Romance loanwords descending from the same Latin rootbecame characteristic elements of Romanian vocabulary during this period.

The spread of prefixes borrowed from other Romance languages and Latin also began in the 19th century. Certain prefixes were first directly inherited from Latin, but later their Latin root was also borrowed, thus "etymological doublets" appeared in Romanian.

The Roman script was introduced gradually between 1830 and 1860. Initially a transitional writing system was introduced which retained certain Cyrillic letters for specific Romanian sounds. For instance, the Romanian mid central vowel (ə) was represented by the Cyrillic letter , and the voiceless palato-alveolar fricative (ʃ) by the letter . A pure Latin writing system was introduced by law in the united Danubian Principalities in 1860.

Recent trends

Linguist Kim Schulte emphasizes that "the large number of words borrowed from other Romance languages over the last two centuries" gives Romanian lexicon "a distinctly Romance appearance". Mallinson likewise concludes that due to the re-latinization process modern Romanian "has attained, if not necessarily retained, a high level of Romance vocabulary, though raw lexical statistics fail to give an adequate picture of precisely how much a Romance language it really is". He argues that some syntactic features also demonstrate how Romanian is "gradually returning to the Romance fold". The revival of the true infinitive and the gradual disappearance of use of reflexive verbs in impersonal passive situations are attributed by scholars to the influence of Western Romance languages. Romanian has a tendency to replace the -uri ending of plural of neuter (or rather ambigeneric) nouns with -e especially in written language. Words ending with -e most probably enjoy a higher status, because many of them were borrowed from Romance languages, according to Mallinson. Linguist Mioara Avram highlights the recent influence of English which, although a Germanic language, has a significant Romance component of French origin, as well as numerous Latin etymological lexemes, and argues that contemporary English loans continue indirectly the old re-latinization or re-romanization process of the Romanian language.

References

Sources

</ref>

Romanian language
Language contact
19th century in Romania
Romanian nationalism
Romanization